Things Could be Worse is an autobiographical novel by Lily Brett about a family of Polish Jews who migrated to Melbourne in the late 1940s.

Plot introduction
The novel chronicles the story of a family of Jewish immigrants in Melbourne over a period of several decades. The novel describes meticulously the problems the family has with coping with its traumatic past.

Plot summary

Renia and Josl Bensky grow up in the Polish town of Łódź, Poland. Shortly after their marriage, they are forced to move to the Ghetto of Łódź, and soon, they are deported to the concentration camp of Auschwitz. After the downfall of the Third Reich, they meet again, and their first daughter Lola is born in a DP camp in 1946.

In 1948, The Benskys move to Melbourne and try to start a new life, far away from the horrible crimes they had to endure during the Holocaust. They find good friends among fellow Jewish Immigrants, and with this tight group of friends, they try to live as normal a life as possible.

Josl and Renia both try to live with their past; in this mixture of trying to forget and to commemorate, they raise Lola to be an Australian girl. Lola knows she will never understand her parents completely since she will never experience what they had to live through. She has her own problems. She has overweight, weird boyfriends and a first husband whom she does not love.

When she turns 19, Lola starts to write for a rock magazine and gets to travel around the world to interview the stars of her time. Apart from her job, she raises her children and tries to figure out her life. Finally, she marries the artist Garth and moves to New York.

Characters in Just Like That
Renia Bensky – a Polish Jew and Holocaust survivor
Josl Bensky – her husband
Lola Bensky – their daughter; protagonist
Garth – her husband
Family Ganz; – family friends
Family Small; – family friends
Family Pekelman; – family friends
Family Berman; – family friends

1990 American novels
Jews and Judaism in Melbourne
Novels by Lily Brett
Novels set in Melbourne
1990 Australian novels